The Higher Education Consortium of Central Massachusetts (HECCMA) is a nonprofit association of eleven public and private colleges and universities located in Central Massachusetts. The Consortium allows full-time students at any of the member colleges or universities to cross-register for one class per semester at other Consortium schools for no additional tuition.

History
The Higher Education Consortium of Central Massachusetts, based in Worcester, Massachusetts, works to "...collaboratively to further the missions of member institutions." Before 2013, the association was known as the Colleges of Worcester Consortium (COWC).

The current President of the Board is Luis G. Pedraja, who is also President of Quinsigamond Community College.

Members
The Higher Education Consortium of Central Massachusetts consists of the following schools:
Anna Maria College
Assumption College
Clark University
College of the Holy Cross
Cummings School of Veterinary Medicine
Massachusetts College of Pharmacy and Health Sciences
Nichols College
Quinsigamond Community College
University of Massachusetts Chan Medical School
Worcester Polytechnic Institute
Worcester State University

Former members include:
Atlantic Union College
Becker College

See also
List of colleges and universities in Massachusetts

References

External links
Official website

College and university associations and consortia in the United States
Organizations based in Worcester, Massachusetts